LOTD may stand for:
 Lesson of the Day- used especially on Twitter
 Land of the Dead, the fourth movie in George A. Romero's "Dead Series"
 Linux on the Desktop, Linux on the Desktop
 Lord of the Dance (disambiguation)
 Laws of thermodynamics, physics laws that describe the specifics for the transport of heat and work in thermodynamic processes
 Legion of the Damned (band), a Dutch thrash/death metal band